Positiva Records is a subsidiary of Universal Music Group and concentrates on releasing dance music in the UK. The record label was set up in 1993, by Nick Halkes, who previously ran XL Recordings. Its headquarters are at the Universal UK offices (formerly at EMI offices in Brook Green in West London), where it is currently the only large dance music label under the EMI banner.

History
One of the label's first releases was "I Like to Move It" by Reel 2 Real, an alias of dance DJ Erick Morillo, originally released on Strictly Rhythm. Later, the label signed US vocalist Barbara Tucker, who went on to release tracks including "Beautiful People" and "Stay Together" (both 1995) and "Stop Playing with My Mind" (2000). Other house releases in this period came from Umboza, the Bucketheads and Judy Cheeks. During the late 1990s, Positiva released several tracks from the emerging trance scene such as Alice Deejay's "Better Off Alone" which became a huge hit in Europe and the U.S., as well as DJ Quicksilver's "Bellissima", Ayla's eponymously titled "Ayla", Binary Finary's "1998" and BBE's "Seven Days and One Week".

Releases in the 2000s have included the number one hits "Toca's Miracle" by Coco Star vs Fragma, "Groovejet (If This Ain't Love)" by Spiller featuring Sophie Ellis-Bextor, and "Lola's Theme" by the Shapeshifters. Other top 10 hits in the same decade include Watergate's "Heart of Asia", "Flashdance" by Deep Dish, Motorcycle's "As the Rush Comes", remixes of The Source feat. Candi Staton's "You Got the Love" and "Watch the Sunrise" by Swedish DJ/producer Axwell.

Other artists who have been with the label for many years include Paul van Dyk and the Shapeshifters, although the latter have since left to release tracks via Defected Records and concentrate on running their own Nocturnal Grooves label.

The label has since been resurrected by Universal Music Group as a trading name for Virgin Records and releases from foreign dance acts, such as Armin van Buuren, Avicii, Nicky Romero and Nervo.

Releases
{| class="wikitable"
|+ List of singles, EPs and studio albums, with selected chart positions and certifications
!Cat #
!Artist
!Title!Year!UK Chart Position (OCC)
|-
| TIV1||Exoterix||Void - Single||1993||58
|-
| TIV2||The Disco Evangelists||De Niro - Single||1993||59
|-
| TIV3||Hyper Go-Go||Never Let Go - Single||1993||45
|-
| TIV4||Wall Of Sound feat Gerald Lethan||Critical (If You Only Knew) - Single||1993||73
|-
| TIV5||D-Tek||Drop The Rock - EP||1993||70
|-
| TIV6||Judy Cheeks||So In Love (The Real Deal) - Single||1993||27
|-
| TIV7||The Disco Evangelists||A New Dawn (Back To The World) - Single||1993||
|-
| TIV8||Diddy||Give Me Love - Single||1994||52
|-
| TIV9||Hyper Go-Go||Raise - Single||1994||36
|-
| TIV10||Reel 2 Reel feat The Mad Stuntman||I Like To Move It - Single||1994||5
|-
| TIV11||Barbara Tucker||Beautiful People - Single||1994||23
|-
| TIV12||Judy Cheeks||Reach - Single||1994||17
|-
| TIV13||Pan Position||Elephant Paw (Get Down To The Funk - Single)||1994||55
|-
| TIV14||Eddy||Someday - Single||1994||49
|-
| TIV15||Reel 2 Reel feat The Mad Stuntman||Go On Move - Single||1994||7
|-
| TIV16||Amos||Only Saw Today/ Instant Karma - Single||1994||48
|-
| TIV17||The Whooliganz||Put Your Handz Up - Single||1994||53
|-
| TIV18||2 In A Room||El Trago (The Drink) - Single||1994||34
|-
| TIV19||Mozaic||Nothing In The World - Single||1994||92
|-
| TIV20||Hyper Go-Go||It's Alright - Single||1994||49
|-
| TIV21||The Purple Kings||That's The Way You Do It - Single||1994||26
|-
| TIV22||Reel 2 Reel feat The Mad Stuntman||Can You Feel It? - Single||1994||13
|-
| TIV23||Barbara Tucker||I Get Lifted - Single||1994||33
|-
| TIV24||Amos||Let Love Shine - Single||1995||31
|-
| TIV25||X-Static||I'm Standing (Higher) - Single||1995||41
|-
| TIV26||Kadoc||The Nighttrain - Single||1996||14
|-
| TIV27||Reel 2 Reel feat The Mad Stuntman||Raise Your Hand - Singles||1995||14
|-
| TIV28||Judy Cheeks||Respect - Single||1995||23
|-
| TIV29||Eddy||(You Bring Out) The Best In Me - Single||1995||81
|-
| TIV30||Reel 2 Reel||Conway - Single||1995||27
|-
| TIV31||The Whooliganz||Whooliganz - Single||1995||95
|-
| TIV32||2 In A Room||Ahora Es (Now Is The Time) - Single||1995||43
|-
| TIV33||Kenny "Dope" pres The Bucketheads||The Bomb! (These Sounds Fall Into My Mind) - Single||1995||5
|-
| TIV34||Judy Cheeks||As Long As You're Good To Me/ You're The Story Of My Life - Single||1995||30
|-
| TIV35||X-Static||Move On Up - Single||1995||Shelved
|-
| TIV36||Joe T. Vannelli Project||Sweetest Day Of May - Single||1995||45
|-
| TIV37||Junior Vasquez||Get Your Hands Off My Man! - Single||1995||22
|-
| TIV38||Amos||Church Of Freedom - Single||1995||54
|-
| TIV39||Barbara Tucker||Stay Together - Single||1995||46
|-
| TIV40||The Ragga Twins||Freedom Train - Single||1995||107
|-
| TIV41||B B Club||Play This House - Single||1995||78
|-
| TIV42||Judy Cheeks||Reach (Reissue)||1996||22
|-
| TIV43||Umboza||Cry India - Single||1995||19
|-
| TIV44||Kenny "Dope" pres The Bucketheads||The Dungeon Tapes, The Story So Far - Single||1995||
|-
| TIV45||The Ragga Twins||Money - Single||1995||Did Not Chart
|-
| TIV46||Ruffneck feat Yavahn||Everybody Be Somebody - Single||1995||13
|-
| TIV47||Umboza||Sunshine - Single||1996||14
|-
| TIV48||Kenny "Dope" pres The Bucketheads||Got Myself Together - Single||1996||12
|-
| TIV49||Transformer 2||Just Can't Get Enough - Single||1996||45
|-
| TIV50||Nylon Moon||Sky Plus - Single||1996||43
|-
| TIV51||Black Magic||Freedom (Make It Funky) - Single||1996||41
|-
| TIV52||Judge Jules & John Kelly pres Stix 'N' Stoned - Single||Outrageous||1996||39
|-
| TIV53||The Beat Syndicate||Throw The Madness - Single||1996||78
|-
| TIV54||Michelle||Standing Here All Alone - Single||1996||69
|-
| TIV55||Scot Project||U (I Got A Feeling) - Single||1996||66
|-
| TIV56||Reel 2 Reel||Are You Ready For Some More? - Single||1996||24
|-
| TIV57||The Lisa Marie Experience||Do That To Me - Single||1996||33
|-
| TIV58||Kadoc||You Got To Be There - Single||1996||45
|-
| TIV59||Reel 2 Reel||Jazz It Up - Single||1996||7
|-
| TIV60||Konya||Come On - Single||1996||123
|-
| TIV61||Ruffneck feat Yavahn||Move Your Body - Single||1996||60
|-
| TIV62||George Morel feat Heather Wildman||Let's Groove - Single||1996||42
|-
| TIV63||Dino Lenny||White Horses - Single||1996||Did Not Chart
|-
| TIV64||Outrage||Tall 'N' Handsome - Single||1996||51
|-
| TIV65||Jeremy Healy & Amos||Stamp! - Single||1996||11
|-
| TIV66||Express Of Sound||Real Vibration (Want Love) - Single||1996||45
|-
| TIV67||B.B.E.||Seven Days And One Week - Single||1996||3
|-
| TIV68||Baby Doc||La Batteria (The Drum Track) - Single||1996||90
|-
| TIV69||Umboza||Paradiso - Single||1996||Promo Only
|-
| TIV70||Reel 2 Reel||Move Your Body (Mueve La Cadera) - Single||1996||Did Not Chart
|-
| TIV71||Qattara||Come With Me - Single||1997||31
|-
| TIV72||DJ Quicksilver||Bellissima - Single||1997||4
|-
| TIV73||B.B.E.||Flash - Single||1997||5
|-
| TIV74||Jeremy Healy & Amos||Argentina - Single||1997||30
|-
| TIV75||Natural Born Grooves||Groovebird - Single||1997||21
|-
| TIV76||Brainbug||Nightmare - Single||1997||11
|-
| TIV77||DJ Quicksilver||Free - Single||1997||7
|-
| TIV78||B-Crew feat. Barbara Tucker, Ultra Nate and Dajae Moné||Partay Feeling - Single||1997||45
|-
| TIV79||Boris Dlugosch pres Booom||Holding Your Head up High - Single||1997||23
|-
| TIV80||Hypertrophy||Just Come Back 2 Me - Single||1997||
|-
| TIV81||Coco||I Need A Miracle - Single||1997||39
|-
| TIV82||Qattara||The Truth - Single||1997||Did Not Chart
|-
| TIV83||Laguna||Spiller From Rio (Do It Easy) - Single||1997||40
|-
| TIV84||PF Project feat. Ewan McGregor||Choose Life - Single||1997||6
|-
| TIV85||Gant||Sound Bwoy Burial/ All Night Lonbg - Single||1997||67
|-
| TIV86||Brainbug||Benedictus/ Nightmare - Single||1997||24
|-
| TIV87||B.B.E.||Desire - Single||1997||19
|-
| TIV88||DJ Quicksilver||Planet Love - Single||1998||12
|-
| TIV89||A vs B||Ripped In 2 Minutes - Single||1998||49
|-
| TIV90||Perpetual Motion||Keep on Dancin' (Let's Go) - Single||1998||12
|-
| TIV91||Groovezone||Eisbaer - Single||1998||85
|-
| TIV92||||||||
|-
| TIV93||B.B.E.||Deeper Love (Symphonic Paradise) - Single||1998||19
|-
| TIV94||Storm||Storm - Single||1998||32
|-
| TIV95||Brainbug||Rain - Single||1998||Promo Only
|-
| TIV96||Barbara Tucker||Everybody Dance (The Horn Song) - Single||1998||28
|-
| TIV97||Spiller||Batucada - Single||1998||Promo Only
|-
| TIV98||Binary Finary||1998 - Single||1998||24
|-
| TIV99||Skinky Pink||Last Train To Kings Cross - Single||1998||
|-
| TIV100||Diva Surprise feat Georgina Jones||On Top Of The World - Single||1998||28
|-
| TIV101||DJ Quicksilver||Timerider - Single||1998||Promo Only
|-
| TIV102||Ayla||Ayla - Single||1998||Shelved
|-
| TIV103||Babe Instinct||Disco Babes From Outer Space - Single||1999||21
|-
| TIV104||Marc et Claude||La - Single||1998||28
|-
| TIV105||Vengaboys||Up And Down - Single||1998||4
|-
| TIV106||Bucketheads||The Bomb! (These Sounds Fall Into My Mind) (reissue)||1999||Shelved
|-
| TIV107||DJ Sakin & Friends||Protect Your Mind (For the Love of a Princess) - Single||1999||4
|-
| TIV108||Vengaboys||We Like To Party! (The Vengabus) - Single||1999||3
|-
| TIV109||A Very Good Friend Of Mine feat Joy||Just Round - Single||1999||55
|-
| TIV110||Veracocha||Carte Blanche - Single||1999||22
|-
| TIV111||PF Project feat Roachford||Walk Away - Single||1999||Promo Only
|-
| TIV112||DJ Sakin & Friends||Nomansland (David's Song) - Single||1999||14
|-
| TIV113||DJ Jurgen pres Alice Deejay||Better Off Alone - Single||1999||2
|-
| TIV114||Vengaboys||Boom, Boom, Boom, Boom!! - Single||1999||1
|-
| TIV115||Marc et Claude||Ne/ La - Single||1999||Promo Only
|-
| TIV116||DJ Sakin & Friends||Stay - Single||1999||Shelved
|-
| TIV117||Ayla||Ayla (reissue)||1999||22
|-
| TIV118||Binary Finary||1999 - Single||1999||11
|-
| TIV119||Vengaboys||We're Going To Ibiza/ Paradise - Single||1999||1
|-
| TIV120||Fragma||Toca Me - Single||1999||11
|-
| TIV121||Alice Deejay||Back In My Life - Single||1999||4
|-
| TIV122||Vengaboys||Kiss (When The Sun Don't Shine) - Single||1999||3
|-
| TIV123||Perfect Phase||Horny Horns - Single||1999||21
|-
| TIV124||Aurora||Hear You Calling - Single||2000||17
|-
| TIV125||Wisdôme||Off The Wall (Enjoy Yourself) - Single||2000||33
|-
| TIV126||Vengaboys||Shalala Lala - Single||2000||5
|-
| TIV127||Barbara Tucker feat Darryl D'Bonneau||Stop Playing With My Mind - Single||2000||17
|-
| TIV128||Fragma||Toca's Miracle - Single||2000||1 removed for copyright infringement
|-
| TIV129||Watergate||Heart of Asia - Single||2000||3
|-
| TIV130||Perfect Phase pres Those 2||Get Wicked - Single||2000||Did Not Chart
|-
| TIV131||Lange feat The Morrighan||Follow Me - Single||2000||1
|-
| TIV132||Novy Vs Eniac||Pumpin - Single||2000||19
|-
| TIV133||DJ Sandy vs Housetrap||Overdrive - Single||2000||32
|-
| TIV134||Alice Deejay||Will I Ever - Single||2000||7
|-
| TIV135||Vengaboys||Uncle John From Jamaica - Single||2000||6
|-
| TIV136||Marc et Claude||I Need Your Lovin' (Like The Sunshine) - Single||2000||12
|-
| TIV137||Spiller feat Sophie Ellis-Bextor||Groovejet (If This Ain't Love) - Single||2000||1
|-
| TIV138||Tru Faith & Dub Conspiracy||Freak Like Me - Single||2000||12
|-
| TIV139||Aurora feat Naimee Coleman||Ordinary World - Single||2000||5
|-
| TIV140||Frisky||I Like The Way - Single||2000||Promo Only
|-
| TIV141||Inaya Day||Feel it - Single||2000||51
|-
| TIV142||Vengaboys feat. Cheekah||Cheekah Bow Bow (That Computer Song) - Single||2000||19
|-
| TIV143||||||||
|-
| TIV144||Sarina Paris||Look At Us - Single||2000||Shelved and released later
|-
| TIV145||Alice Deejay||The Lonely One - Single||2000||16
|-
| TIV146||Storm||Storm - Single||2000||Shelved and released later
|-
| TIV147||Fragma||Everytime You Need Me - Single||2001||3
|-
| TIV148||Vengaboys||Forever As On - Singlee||2001||28
|-
| TIV149||Alice Deejay||Celebrate Our Love - Single||2001||17
|-
| TIV150||Hypetraxx||The Dark Side - Single||2000||Promo Only
|-
| TIV151||Marc et Claude||Loving You - Single||2001||115
|-
| TIV152||Simon||Free At Last - Single||2001||36
|-
| TIV153||Fragma||You Are Alive - Single||2001||4
|-
| TIV154||Storm||Storm  - Single (Reissue)||2001||32
|-
| TIV155||Trisco||Musak - Single||2001||28
|-
| TIV156||Boris Dlugosch feat Roisin Murphy||Never Enough - Single||2001||16
|-
| TIV157||Dreamcatcher||I Don't Wanna Lose My Way - Single||2002||14
|-
| TIV158||Barthezz||On The Move - Single||2001||18
|-
| TIV159||Sarina Paris||Look At Us - Single||2001||Promo Only
|-
| TIV160||Aurora||Dreaming - Single||2002||24
|-
| TIV161||Infernal Machine||Realistic - Single||2001||Shelved
|-
| TIV162||[Love] Tattoo||Drop Some Drums - Single||2001||58
|-
| TIV163||Spiller||Cry Baby - EP||2001||Promo Only
|-
| TIV164||The Ones||Flawless - Single||2001||7
|-
| TIV165||Orinoko||Island - Single||2001||10
|-
| TIV166||Milk & Sugar Vs Joh Paul Young||Love Is In The Air - Single||2002||25
|-
| TIV167||Spiller||Cry Baby - Single||2002||40
|-
| TIV168||Barthezz||Infected - Single||2002||25
|-
| TIV169||Lasgo||Something - Single||2002||4
|-
| TIV170||Marc et Claude||Tremble - Single||2002||29
|-
| TIV171||Shy FX & T-Power||Shake Ur Body (Feat. Di)- Single||2002||7
|-
| TIV172||The Scumfrog Vs Bowie||Loving The Alien - Single||2002||41
|-
| TIV173||Ferry Corsten||Punk - Single||2002||29
|-
| TIV174||Souvernance||Havin' A Good Time - Single||2002||63
|-
| TIV175||Solid Sessions||Janeiro - Single||2002||47
|-
| TIV176||Lasgo||Alone - Single||2002||7
|-
| TIV177||Trisco||Ultra - Single||2002|| 
|-
| TIV178||Dreamcatcher||Twisted - Single||2002|| 
|-
| TIV179||Milk Inc||Walk On Water - Single||2002||10
|-
| TIV180||Sash!||Ganbareh - Single||2002||Promo Only
|-
| TIV181||DJ Sandy vs Housetrap||Overdrive  - Single (reissue)||2002||2
|-
| TIV182||Lasgo||Pray - Single||2002||17
|-
| TIV183||||||||
|-
| Not Found||Moony||Dove (I'll Be Loving You) - EP||2002||
|-
| TIV184||Milk Inc||Land Of The Living - Single||2003||18
|-
| TIV185||Driftwood||Freeloader - Single||2003||32
|-
| TIV186||The Ones||Superstar - Single||2003||45
|-
| TIV187||Room 5 feat Oliver Cheatham||Make Luv - Single||2003||1
|-
| TIV188||Bhangra Knights Vs Husan||Husan - Single||2003||7
|-
| TIV189||Kid Crème feat Charlise Rockwood||Hypnotising - Single||2003||31
|-
| TIV190||Marc et Claude||Loving You '03 - Single||2003||37
|-
| TIV191||The Scumfrog||Music Revolution - Single||2003||46
|-
| TIV192||Paul van Dyk feat Hemstock & Jennings||Nothing But You - Single||2003||14
|-
| TIV193||Harry's Afro Hut||C'mon Lady - Single||2003||Did Not Chart
|-
| TIV194||Double Dee||Shining - Single||2003||58
|-
| TIV195||Amen! UK||Passion - Single||2003||40
|-
| TIV196||Paul van Dyk feat Vega 4||Time Of Our Lives/ Connected - Single||2003||28
|-
| TIV197||Room 5 feat Oliver Cheatham||Music & You - Single||2003||38
|-
| TIV198||Jaydee||Plastic Dreams - Single||2004||35
|-
| TIV199||Despina Vandi||Gia||2004||63
|-
| TIV200||Brainbug||Nightmare (2004 Remixes) - EP||2004||63
|-
| TIV201||Mr On Vs Jungle Brothers||Breathe Don't Stop - Single||2004||21
|-
| TIV202||Ferry Corsten||Rock Your Body Rock - Single||2004||11
|-
| TIV203||Motorcycle||As The Rush Comes - Single||2004||11
|-
| TIV204||Paul van Dyk feat Second Sun||Crush - Single||2004||42
|-
| TIV205||Lasgo||Surrender - Single||2004||24
|-
| TIV206||Ferry Corsten||It's Time - Single||2004||51
|-
| TIV207||The Shapeshifters||Lola's Theme - Single||2004||1
|-
| TIV208||||||||
|-
| TIV209||Scent||Up & Down - Single||2004||23
|-
| TIV210||Brad Carter||Morning Always Comes Too Soon - Single||2004||48
|-
| TIV211||Deep Dish||Flashdance - Single||2004||3
|-
| TIV212||Red Carpet||Alright - Single||2004||48
|-
| TIV213||Reflekt feat Delline Bass||Need to Feel Loved - Single||2005||14
|-
| TIV214||The Lovefreekz||Shine - Single||2005||6
|-
| TIV215||Ferry Corsten||Holding On - Single||2005||Promo Only
|-
| TIV216||Shapeshifters||Back To Basics - Single||2005||10
|-
| TIV217||Black Rock||Blue Water - Single||2005||36
|-
| TIV218||Poker Pets||Lovin' You - Single||2005||43
|-
| TIV219||M.V.P.||Roc Ya Body 'Mic Check 1.2' - Single||2005||5
|-
| TIV220||Deep Dish||Say Hello - Single||2005||14
|-
| TIV221||Paul van Dyk feat Wayne Jackson||The Other Side - Single||2005||58
|-
| TIV222||Lil' Love||Little Love - Single||2005||34
|-
| TIV223||Speedy feat Lumidee||Sientelo - Single||2005||104
|-
| TIV224||Olav Basoski||Waterman - Single||2005||45
|-
| TIV225||Rachael Starr||Till There Was You - Single||2005||Did Not Chart
|-
| TIV226||Jenn Cuneta||Come Rain Come Shine - Single||2005||80
|-
| TIV227||M.V.P.||Bounce, Shake, Move, Stop! - Single||2006||22
|-
| TIV228||Deep Dish feat Morel||Sacramento - EP||2005||Did Not Chart
|-
| TIV229||Ferry Corsten||Fire - Single||2006||40
|-
| TIV230||The Source||You Got The Love (feat. Candi Staton) - Single||2006||7
|-
| TIV231||Red Carpet||Alright - Single||2006||74
|-
| TIV232||Deep Dish||Dreams - Single||2006||14
|-
| TIV233||Shapeshifters||Incredible - Single||2006||12
|-
| TIV234||MYNC Project & Danny Rampling||Strobelight - Single||2006||Did Not Chart
|-
| TIV235||||||||
|-
| TIV236||Soul Avengerz||Sing - EP||2006||89
|-
| TIV237||Teamsters feat Errol Reid||Feels Like Love - Single||2006||93
|-
| TIV238||Shapeshifts & Chic||Sensitivity - Single||2006||40
|-
| TIV239||Ferry Corsten||Watch Out - Single||2006||57
|-
| TIV240||KMC||Soul On Fire - Single||2006||Promo Only
|-
| TIV241||Chocolate Puma feat David Goncalves||Always And Forever - Single||2006||43
|-
| TIV242||Dario G||Ring Of Fire - Single||2006||178
|-
| TIV243||Axwell feat Steve Edwards||Watch The Sunris - Singlee||2006||70
|-
| TIV244||Soul Avengerz feat Javine||Don't Let The Morning Come - Single||2006||49
|-
| TIV245||Sunfreakz feat Andrea Britton||Counting Down the Days - Single||2007||37
|-
| TIV246||Blondie Vs Edison||Heart Of Glass - Single||2006||131
|-
| TIV247||Shapeshifters||If In Doubt Go Out - Single||2006||Promo Only
|-
| TIV248||Ferry Corsten feat Guru||Junk - Single||2006||122
|-
| TIV249||Soul Seekerz feat Kate Smith||Party For The Weeken - Singled||2006||Promo Only
|-
| TIV250||Queen Vs The Miami Project||Another One Bites The Dust - Single||2006||31
|-
| TIV251||Atrium||In Love With You - Single||2007||Did Not Chart
|-
| TIV252||Kathy Brown Vs Miami Calling||Dare Me - Single||2006||Promo Only
|-
| TIV253||Another Chance||Everytime I See Her (Sound Of Eden) - Single||2007||62
|-
| TIV254||Audio Club||Sumthin Serious - Single||2007||Did Not Chart
|-
| TIV255||Therese||Feelin' Me||2007||61
|-
| TIV256||DJ Mike Cruz pres Inaya Day & Chyna Ro||Movin' On||2007||Shelved
|-
| TIV257||Soul Seekerz feat. Kate Smith||Party For The Weekend - Single||2007||Did Not Chart
|-
| TIV258||Shapeshifters||Pusher - Single||2007||56
|-
| TIV259||Paul van Dyk feat Jessica Sutta||White Lies - Single||2007||80
|-
| TIV260||Charlean Dance||MR DJ - Single||2007||51
|-
| TIV261||Axwell feat. Max'C||I Found U - Single||2007||6
|-
| TIV262||Shapeshifters||New Day - Single||2007||72
|-
| TIV263||Se:Sa feat Sharon Phillips||Like This Like That - Single||2007||63
|-
| TIV264||Filo & Peri feat Eric Lumiere||Anthem - Single||2007||39
|-
| TIV265||Che'Nelle Feat Cham||I Fell In Love With The DJ - Single||2007||Promo Only
|-
| TIV266||Paul van Dyk feat Rea Garvey||Let Go - Single||2007||Did Not Chart
|-
| TIV267||Mark Brown feat Sarah Cracknell||The Journey Continues - Single||2008||11
|-
| TIV268||Fragma||Toca's Miracle 2008 - Single||2008||16 removed for copyright infringement
|-
| TIV269||Che'Nelle||Hurry Up/ I Fell In Love With The DJ - Single||2007||Promo Only
|-
| TIV270||Jerry Ropero feat Cozi||The Storm - Single||2008||Did Not Chart
|-
| TIV271||Buy Now!||Body Crash - Single||2008||55
|-
| TIV272||Velvet||Fix Me - Single||2008||Promo Only
|-
| TIV273||James Doman||Everything's Gonna Be Alright - Single||2008||50
|-
| TIV274||||||||
|-
| TIV275||Axwell & Bob Sinclair feat Ron Carroll||What A Wonderful World - Single||2008||48
|-
| TIV276||||||||
|-
| TIV277||David Guetta & Chris Willis Vs Tocadisco||Tomorrow Can Wait - Single||2008||142
|-
| TIV278||The Shapeshifters||Lola's Theme (2008 Re-Edit)||2008||Did Not Chart
|-
| Not Found||Swingfly||Singing That Melody - Single||2008||
|-
| Not Found||Kleerup Feat. Marit Bergman||3am - Single||2008||
|-
| TIV279||David Guetta & Chris Willis With Steve Angello & Sebastian Ingrosso||Everytime We Touch||2009||68
|-
| TIV280||||||||
|-
| TIV281||Doman & Gooding feat Dru & Lincoln||Runnin' - Single||2009||56
|-
| TIV282||Reflekt feat Delline Bass||Need To feel Loved (reissue) - Single||2009||188
|-
| TIV283||Kleerup feat Titiyo||Longing for Lullabies - Single||2009||Did Not Chart
|-
| TIV284||||||||
|-
| TIV285||McLloyd||Tembisa Funk - Single||2009||Did Not Chart
|-
| TIV286||||||||
|-
| TIV287||David Guetta feat Kelly Rowland||When Love Takes Over - Single||2009||1
|-
| TIV288||Alina||When You Leave (Numa Numa) - Single||2009||Promo Only
|-
| TIV289||Pitbull||I Know You Want Me (Calle Ocho) - Single||2009||4
|-
| TIV290||||||||
|-
| TIV291||||||||
|-
| TIV292||||||||
|-
| TIV293||||||||
|-
| TIV294||Gramophonedzie||Why Don't You - Single||2009||12 (Released later)
|-
| TIV295||||||||
|-
| TIV296||David Guetta feat Estella||One Love - Single||2009||46
|-
| Not Found||Lonnie Gordon||Catch You Baby - Single||2009||
|-
| Not Found||Phonjaxx Ft. Cozi||Sensual - Single||2009||
|-
| Not Found||Velvet||Chemistry - Single||2009||
|-
| Not Found||Timmy Vegas & Bad Lay-Dee||Another Dimension - Single||2009||
|-
| TIV297||||||||
|-
| TIV298||David Guetta & Chris Willis feat Fergie & LMFAO||Getting' Over You - Single||2010||1
|-
| TIV299||||||||
|-
| TIV300||David Guetta featuring Rihanna||Who's That Chick? - Single||2010||6
|-
| Not Found||NERVO feat. Ollie James||Irresistible - Single||2010||
|-
| Not Found||DJ Sava feat Raluka||I Like The Trumpet - Single||2010||
|-
| Not Found||Billy The Kit feat. Stennis, Duvall & Bnann||Higher - Single||2011||
|-
| Not Found||David Guetta featuring Flo Rida and Nicki Minaj||Where Them Girls At - Single||2011||
|-
| Not Found||Alex Metric + Steve Angello||Open Your Eyes - Single||2011||89
|-
| Not Found||Alex Metric||Open Your Eyes (Remixes & Productions) - Album||2011||
|-
| Not Found||David Guetta||Nothing but the Beat - Album||2011||2
|-
| Not Found||David Guetta featuring Usher||Without You - Single||2011||6
|-
| Not Found||David Guetta featuring Sia||Titanium - Single||2011||1
|-
| Not Found||Swedish House Mafia||One (Your Name) (feat. Pharrell) - Single||2011||7
|-
| Not Found||NERVO||We're All No One (feat. Afrojack & Steve Aoki) - Single||2012||135
|-
| Not Found||David Guetta featuring Nicki Minaj||Turn Me On - Single||2011||8
|-
| Not Found||Arno Cost & Norman Doray||Strong - Single||2011||
|-
| Not Found||Vox Halo ft. LaDolla||Criminal - Single||2011||
|-
| Not Found||Sebjak||Follow Me - Single||2012||
|-
| Not Found||Sam Sparro||I Wish I Never Met You - Single||2012||
|-
| Not Found||Sam Sparro||Return to Paradise - Album||2012||
|-
| Not Found||David Guetta featuring Chris Brown and Lil Wayne||I Can Only Imagine - Single||2012||
|-
| Not Found||Patric la Funk & DJ Delicious||SMILE - Single||2012||
|-
| Not Found||NERVO||You're Gonna Love Again - Single||2012||89
|-
| Not Found||Mike Hawkins & Jay Colin||Shut the Place Down - Single||2012||
|-
| Not Found||Russ Chimes||Back 2 You - Single||2012||
|-
| Not Found||Wally Lopez feat. Kreesha Turner||Keep Running the Melody(The Japanese PopStars Remix) - Single||2012||Promo Only
|-
| Not Found||SEEKERSTARS||Non ci fermeremo mai (Figli delle stelle) - Single||2012||
|-
| Not Found||David Jimenez||Neon - Single||2012||
|-
| Not Found||Avicii vs Nicky Romero||I Could Be The One (Nicktim) - Single||2013||1
|-
| Not Found||Avicii||X You - Single||2013||47
|-
| Not Found||Nicky Romero & NERVO||Like Home - Single||2013||33
|-
| Not Found||Armin van Buuren||This Is What It Feels Like (feat. Trevor Guthrie) - Single||2013||6
|-
| Not Found||Avicii ||Wake Me Up - Single||2013||1
|-
| Not Found||Armin van Buuren ||Intense - Album||2013||37
|-
| Not Found||Armin van Buuren||Beautiful Life (feat. Cindy Alma) - Single||2013||Promo Only
|-
| Not Found||Wankelmut & Emma Louise||My Head Is A Jungle - Single||2013||5
|-
| Not Found||Martin Garrix||Animals - Single||2013||1
|-
| Not Found||Avicii||Hey Brother - Single||2013||2
|-
| Not Found||Armin van Buuren||Who's Afraid Of 138?! - Single||2013||
|-
| Not Found||Cazzette||Run For Cover - Single||2013||
|-
| Not Found||Armin van Buuren||Save My Night - Single||2014||85
|-
| Not Found||Sick Individuals and Axwell||I AM (feat. Taylr Renee) - Single||2014||
|-
| Not Found||Martin Garrix & Jay Hardway||Wizard - Single||2014||1
|-
| Not Found||Deep Dish||Quincy - Single||2014||
|-
| Not Found||Avicii||True (Avicii by Avicii) - Album||2014||55
|-
| Not Found||Armin van Buuren||Ping Pong - Single||2014||
|-
| Not Found||Dimitri Vegas, Martin Garrix & Like Mike||Tremor (Sensation 2014 Anthem) - Single||2014||30
|-
| Not Found||Dada Life||Born To Rage - EP||2014||
|-
| Not Found||Avicii||Lay Me Down - Single(Reissue)||2014||
|-
| Not Found||GOLDHOUSE||FeelGood - EP||2014||
|-
| Not Found||Wankelmut & Emma Louise||My Head Is A Jungle (MK Remix) - Single(Reissue)||2014||
|-
| Not Found||Bingo Players||Knock You Out - Single||2014||
|-
| Not Found||Sander van Doorn, Martin Garrix, DVBBS ft. Aleesia||Gold Skies - Single||2014||49
|-
| Not Found||Various Artists||POSITIVA 21||2014||
|-
| Not Found||Avicii||The Nights - Single||2015||6
|-
| Not Found||Eelke Kleijn||Mistakes I've Made - Single||2015||
|-
| Not Found||L’Tric||This Feeling - Single||2015||
|-
| Not Found||Alex Adair||Make Me Feel Better - Single||2015||13
|-
| Not Found||Audien||Insomnia (feat. Parson James) - Single||2015||
|-
| Not Found||Kid Crème & Jolyon Petch||Look For Me - Single||2015||
|-
| Not Found||David Zowie||House Every Weekend - Single||2015||
|-
| Not Found||Avicii||Waiting For Love - Single||2015||6
|-
| Not Found||Martin Solveig & GTA||Intoxicated - Single||2015||5
|-
| Not Found||Avicii||Pure Grinding / For A Better Day - Single||2015||68 (For A Better Day)
|-
| Not Found||Hayden James||Something About You- Single||2015||
|-
| Not Found||Martin Solveig||+1 (feat. Sam White) - Single||2015||51
|-
| Not Found||Avicii||Stories - Album||2015||9
|-
| Not Found||Dada Life||One Last Night on Earth||2015||
|-
| TIV350||Oliver Heldens & Shaun Frank||Shades of Grey (feat. Delaney Jane) - Single||2015||
|-
| TIV353||Jonas Blue||Fast Car (feat. Dakota) - Single||2015||2
|-
| Not Found ||MOGUAI||Hold On (feat. Cheat Codes) - Single||2016||Released later
|-
| Not Found ||Audien||Daydreams - EP||2016||
|-
| Not Found ||MÖWE & Daniel Nitt||Lovers Friends - Single||2016||Promo Only
|-
| Not Found ||Audien||Something Better (feat. Lady Antebellum) - Single||2016||
|-
| Not Found ||MOTi||Turn Me Up (feat. Nabiha) - Single||2016||Promo Only
|-
| Not Found||Martin Solveig||Do It Right (feat. Tkay Maidza) - Single||2016||97
|-
| Not Found||Jonas Blue||Perfect Strangers (feat. JP Cooper) - Single||2016||2
|-
| Not Found||Zash||Sweet Harmony - Single||2016||
|-
| Not Found||offaiah||Trouble - Single||2016||29
|-
| Not Found||Throttle||Money Maker (feat. Lunchmoney Lewis & Aston Merrygold) - Single||2016||
|-
| Not Found||Armin van Buuren feat. Trevor Guthrie ||This Is What It Feels Like (Matt Lange Remix) - Single||2016||Promo Only
|-
| Not Found||Jonas Blue||By Your Side (feat. RAYE) - Single||2016||15
|-
| Not Found||Martin Solveig||Places (feat. Ina Wroldsen) - Single||2016||27
|-
| Not Found||KATO & Sigala||Show You Love (feat. Hailee Steinfeld) - Single||2017||91
|-
| Not Found||offaiah||Run - Single||2017||
|-
| Not Found||Tom & Collins||Mutual (feat. Whitney Phillips) - Single||2017||
|-
| TIV367||Jonas Blue||Mama (feat. William Singe) - Single||2017||4
|-
| Not Found||Jonas Blue||Electronic Nature Volume 1 - EP||2017||
|-
| Not Found||Audien x MAX||One More Weekend - Single||2017||
|-
| Not Found||Axwell & Ingrosso||More Than You Know - EP||2017||30
|-
| Not Found||KIKKR||You're Makin' Me High (feat. Ideh) - Single||2017||Release Later
|-
| Not Found||Jay Pryor||Teenage Crime - Single||2017||Promo Only
|-
| Not Found||Tujamo||One On One (feat. Sorana) - Single||2017||Promo Only
|-
| Not Found||Seeb & Greg Holden||Boys In The Street - Single||2017||
|-
| Not Found||Audien x 3LAU||Hot Water (feat. Victoria Zaro) - Single||2017||
|-
| Not Found||Martin Solveig||All Stars (feat. Alma) - Single||2017||
|-
| Not Found||Merk & Kremont||Sad Story (Out of Luck) - Single||2017||
|-
| Not Found||Hardwell & Austin Mahone||Creatures Of The Night - Single||2017||
|-
| Not Found||offaiah||Run This Town (feat. Shenseea) - Single||2017||Release Later
|-
| Not Found||Kid Crème & Jolyon Petch||Boy In The Picture - Single||2017||
|-
| Not Found||Avicii||Avīci (01) - EP||2017||
|-
| Not Found||Burak Yeter x Ryan Riback||GO 2.0 - Single||2017||
|-
| Not Found||David Zowie||The Real Don - Single||2017||
|-
| Not Found||Jonas Blue||We Could Go Back (feat. Moelogo) - Single||2017||74
|-
| Not Found||Nick Talos||Glass House (feat. BullySongs) - Single||2017||
|-
| Not Found||Marnik||Burn (feat. Rookies) - Single||2017||
|-
| Not Found||Arlissa & Jonas Blue||Hearts Ain't Gonna Lie - Single||2018||
|-
| Not Found||ROOKIES||California - Single||2018||Release Later
|-
| Not Found||Oliver Nelson & Tobtok||99 Red Balloons (feat. River) - Single||2018||
|-
| Not Found||Gorgon City||Motorola - Single||2018||
|-
| Not Found||Tritonal||Out My Mind (feat. Riley Clemmons) - Single||2018||
|-
| Not Found||Tom & Collins||Only One (feat. Rachel West) - Single||2018||
|-
| Not Found||Jay Pryor||Rich Kid$ (feat. IDA) - Single||2018||
|-
| PTV2501||Scot Project||U (I Got a Feeling) [Eats Everything Reebeef] - Single||2018||
|-
| Not Found||CID, Bahary & The Flying Lizards||Money - Single||2018||
|-
| PTV2502||Motorcycle||As The Rush Comes (The 2018 Remixes) - EP||2018||Promo Only, Release Later
|-
| Not Found||Tiësto & Dzeko||Jackie Chan (feat. Preme & Post Malone) - Single||2018||5
|-
| PTV2503||The Disco Evangelists||De Niro (The Remixes) - EP||2018||Release Later for Side B
|-
| TIV384||Jonas Blue||Rise (feat. Jack & Jack) - Single||2018||3
|-
| Not Found||Polar Youth||All Night (feat. Georgie Allen) - Single||2018||
|-
| PTV2504||Reel 2 Reel feat The Mad Stuntman||Raise Your Hands (Shadow Child Update) - Single||2018||
|-
| Not Found||Jonas Blue||I See Love (feat. Joe Jonas) - Single||2018||
|-
| Not Found||Martin Solveig||My Love - Single||2018||
|-
| TIV388||Ten Ven||Just About - Single||2018||
|-
| Not Found||Purple Disco Machine||Dished (Male Stripper) - Single||2018||Release Later
|-
| Not Found||Young Romantic||Move (Time To Get Loose) - Single||2018||Release Later
|-
| Not Found||Marshmello||Happier (feat. Bastille) - Single||2018||2
|-
| PTV2505||George Morel||Let's Groove [Melé Mix] - Single||2018||
|-
| Not Found||Showtek & MOTi||Down Easy (feat. Starley & Wyclef Jean) - Single||2018||Release Later
|-
| PTV2506||B.B.E.||Seven Days And One Week (Yotto Remix) - Single||2018||
|-
| Not Found||Jonas Blue, Liam Payne & Lennon Stella||Polaroid - Single||2018||3
|-
| Not Found||Moon Willis||On Me (feat. Jenay Faith) - Single||2018||
|-
| Not Found||Jonas Blue||Blue - Album||2018||33
|-
| Not Found||Jay Pryor||Make Luv - Single||2018||
|-
| PTV2507||Barbara Tucker||Beautiful People (Floorplan Remix) - Single||2018||
|-
| Not Found||Brooks||Limbo (feat. Zoё Moss) - Single||2018||
|-
| Not Found||Seeb & Bastille||Grip - Single||2018||
|-
| TIV397||Arno Cost & Norman Doray||Together - Single||2019||
|-
| PTV2508||The Shapeshifters||Lola's Theme (Mella Dee Big Room Banger Mix) - EP||2019||
|-
| Not Found||Moon Willis||Trouble - Single||2019||
|-
| TIV400||Paul Woolford & Karen Harding||You Already Know - Single||2019||Release Later
|-
| Not Found||Jay Pryor||So What - Single||2019||
|-
| Not Found||Purple Disco Machine||Body Funk (2019 Edit) - Single||2019||Release Later
|-
| Not Found||Marshmello||Here With Me (feat. CHVRCHES) - Single||2019||9
|-
| Not Found||Josiah and the Bonnevilles||Swing (SDJM Remix) - Single||2019||Promo Only
|-
| Not Found||Jonas Blue||What I like About You (feat. Theresa Rex) - Single||2019||22
|-
| Not Found||Avicii||SOS (feat. Aloe Blacc) - Single||2019||6
|-
| PTV2509||Kenny "Dope" pres The Bucketheads||Got Myself Together (Ejeca Rework) - Single||2019||
|-
| Not Found||Syn Cole||Lights Go Down (feat. Dakota) - Single||2019||
|-
| Not Found||Marshmello||Light It Up (feat. Tyga & Chris Brown) - Single||2019||
|-
| Not Found||Wh0||Happy People (feat. Byron Stingily) - Single||2019||
|-
| Not Found||Jax Jones and Martin Solveig pres Europa||All Day and Night (with Madison Beer) - Single||2019||10 (Promo Only)
|-
| Not Found||Rafman||Wayside - Single||2019||
|-
| Not Found||R3HAB & Julie Bergan||Don't Give Up On Me Now - Single||2019||Promo Only
|-
| Not Found||Agoria||Remedy (feat. NOEMIE) (Remixes) - EP||2019||Promo Only, Release Later
|-
| Not Found||Moon Willis & Etta Bond||I Like The Way - Single||2019||
|-
| Not Found||Avicii||Tough Love (feat. Agnes, Vargas & Lagola) - Single||2019||60
|-
| Not Found||Ten Ven||Talk to Me - Single||2019||
|-
| Not Found||Tiësto, Jonas Blue & Rita Ora||Ritual - Single||2019||24
|-
| Not Found||Avicii||Tim - Album||2019||7
|-
| Not Found||Xpansions||Move Your Body (Elevation) [Remixes] - EP||2019||
|-
| Not Found||One Bit & Laura White||Back To You - Single||2019||
|-
| Not Found||Jonas Blue||I Wanna Dance - Single||2019||
|-
| Not Found||Purple Disco Machine||Emotions - EP||2019||
|-
| Not Found||Jay Pryor & Steve James||Finding Our Way - Single||2019||
|-
| Not Found||Jonas Blue & Hrvy||Younger - Single||2019||
|-
| Not Found||TCTS||Not Ready For Love (feat. Maya B) - Single||2019||
|-
| Not Found||ZHU, partywithray||Came For The Low - Single||2019||
|-
| Not Found||Jonas Blue & Retrovision||All Night Long - Single||2019||
|-
| Not Found||R3HAB, ZAYN & Jungleboi||Flames - Single||2019||
|-
| Not Found||Syn Cole||Mind Blown - Single||2019||
|-
| Not Found||Jay Pryor||By Now - Single||2019||
|-
| Not Found||Martin Solveig||Juliet & Romeo (feat. Roy Woods) - Single||2019||51
|-
| Not Found||Jonas Blue & Tifa Chen||Billboard - Single||2019||
|-
| Not Found||Topic||Breaking Me (feat. A7S) - Single||2019||3
|-
| Not Found||Daniel Blume||Nights Like This - Single||2020||
|-
| Not Found||R3HAB, Clara Mae, Frank Walker||More Than OK - Single||2020||Promo Only
|-
| Not Found||Kygo, Avicii & Sandro Cavazza||Forever Yours (Avicii Tribute) - Single||2020||
|-
| Not Found||Purple Disco Machine||In My Arms - Single||2020||
|-
| Not Found||Arno Cost & Norman Doray||Darlin' - Single||2020||
|-
| Not Found||Jax Jones and Martin Solveig pres Europa||Tequila (feat. RAYE) - Single||2020||21
|-
| Not Found||Jonas Blue & Paloma Faith||Mistakes - Single||2020||
|-
| Not Found||Joy Club||In The Night - Single||2020||
|-
| Not Found||Alesso & DubVision||One Last Time - Single||2020||
|-
| Not Found||Wankelmut & SVEA||Give & Take - Single||2020||
|-
| Not Found||Jack Back||Superstar DJ - Single||2020||
|-
| Not Found||Daniel Blume||Catch Feelings - Single||2020||
|-
| Not Found||Showtek & Spree Wilson||The Weekend (feat. Eva Shaw) - Single||2020||
|-
| Not Found||Punctual||Imagine - Single||2020||Promo Only
|-
| Not Found||Purple Disco Machine & Sophie and the Giants||Hypnotized - Single||2020||
|-
| Not Found||Hayden James & Icona Pop||Right Time - Single||2020||
|-
| Not Found||Mike Mago||On Repeat (feat. Kelli-Leigh) - Single||2020||Promo Only
|-
| Not Found||Seeb, GOODBOYS & HRVY||Unfamiliar - Single||2020||
|-
| Not Found||Halsey & Marshmello||Be Kind - Single||2020||Promo Only
|-
| Not Found||Chris Lake||I Remember - Single||2020||Promo Only
|-
| Not Found||Rasster||Sad (Imanbek xxx Remix) - Single||2020||Promo Only, Release Later
|-
| Not Found||Mike Mago||Recognise - Single||2020||
|-
| Not Found||Alok, Axel Cooper & Stefy De Cicco||Te Boté - Single||2020||
|-
| Not Found||Wankelmut||Can't Force Love - Single||2020||
|-
| Not Found||Kungs||Dopamine (feat. JHart) - Single||2020||Promo Only
|-
| TIV447 ||Jonas Blue & MAX||Naked - Single||2020||
|-
| Not Found||Hayden James & Azteck||Waves of Gold (feat. Paije) - Single||2020||Promo Only
|-
| Not Found||Alok, Martin Jensen, Jason Derulo||Don't Cry For Me - Single||2020||
|-
| Not Found||Sub Focus & Wilkinson||Just Hold On - Single||2020||
|-
| TIV437 ||Paris Green||Oh Yes (feat. Marvin Gaye & Tammi Terrell) - Single||2020||
|-
|}

NotesA Released on Positiva's sub label Additive instead after promo releaseB Charted on the UK budget album chart as the total track length of the format exceeded the 20 minute rule in place at the timeC Released through EMI instead after promo releaseD' Released through EMI subsidiary Feverpitch instead after promo release

See alsoThe Positiva Ambient Collection'' (1993)
List of electronic music record labels

References

External links
 Official site

British record labels
English record labels
1993 establishments in England
Record labels established in 1993
English electronic dance music record labels
EMI